USS Royone (IX-235) was a training ship in the United States Navy.

A former oil screw yacht, Royone was built in Bristol, Rhode Island, in 1936; donated to the United States Naval Academy on 20 December 1949; accepted by the Navy on 2 March 1950, commissioned in April 1950; and used for instruction and recreation of the midshipmen.

On 26 June 1967 she was declared excess to the needs of the Navy, and on 1 July she was struck from the Navy Directory.

References
 

Training ships of the United States Navy
1936 ships